Kamran Hedayati ( kâmrân hedâyati; 1 April 1949 in Iranian Kurdistan – 6 July 1996 in Stockholm, Sweden) was an Iranian Kurdish dissident who was assassinated in Sweden in the 1990s. In January 1994, Hedayati was seriously wounded after opening a letter bomb in his apartment in Bagarmossen, Stockholm, Sweden. He lost his hands and sight in the attack and died from his wounds two years later. The murder remains officially unsolved. However, the Iranian government is widely believed to have ordered the assassination, as it had many similarities with other assassinations and assassination attempts on eastern Kurdish dissidents around the world at this time. In 1990, a Kurdish woman named Effat Ghazi was killed in a similar attack through letter bombing in her apartment in Västerås.

See also 
Effat Ghazi
Karim Mohammedzadeh

References 

1949 births
1996 deaths
Assassinated Iranian Kurdish dissidents
Terrorism deaths in Sweden
Deaths by letter bomb
People murdered in Sweden
Iranian people murdered abroad
Iranian terrorism victims